"Madalaine" is the debut single by American rock band Winger, from their self-titled debut album Winger. Released in 1988, the song reached #27 on the Mainstream rock Billboard charts. According to Kip Winger, it was one of the first four songs he and bandmate Reb Beach wrote when they first got together, based on a handful of riffs Reb had from when he was younger. Kip figured out how best to arrange the riffs, enabling the pair to complete the song.

Track listing
7" single

Cassette single

CD single

Promo CD single

Charts

References

1988 debut singles
1988 songs
Atlantic Records singles
Song recordings produced by Beau Hill
Songs written by Beau Hill
Songs written by Kip Winger
Winger (band) songs
Songs written by Reb Beach